The Chengdu–Zigong high-speed railway is a high-speed railway currently under construction in China. It runs between Chengdu and Zigong via Chengdu Tianfu International Airport.

History
The section from Chengdu to Tianfu airport was approved in October 2017. The whole line was approved on 14 January 2019.

Stations

References

High-speed railway lines in China
High-speed railway lines under construction
Airport rail links in China